Misionis Bay (‘Zaliv Misionis’ \'za-liv mi-si-'o-nis\) is the 1.6 km wide bay indenting for 2.35 km the northeast coast of Pickwick Island in the Pitt group of Biscoe Islands, Antarctica. It is entered east of Kusev Point and west of Plakuder Point.

The bay is named after the ancient and medieval town of Misionis in Northeastern Bulgaria.

Location
British mapping in 1971.

Maps
 British Antarctic Territory: Graham Coast.  Scale 1:200000 topographic map.  DOS 610 Series, Sheet W 65 64.  Directorate of Overseas Surveys, UK, 1971.
 Antarctic Digital Database (ADD). Scale 1:250000 topographic map of Antarctica. Scientific Committee on Antarctic Research (SCAR). Since 1993, regularly upgraded and updated.

References
 Bulgarian Antarctic Gazetteer. Antarctic Place-names Commission. (details in Bulgarian, basic data in English)
 Misionis Bay. SCAR Composite Antarctic Gazetteer.

External links
 Misionis Bay. Copernix satellite image

Bays of Graham Land
Landforms of the Biscoe Islands
Bulgaria and the Antarctic